MEDA (3-methoxy-4,5-ethylenedioxyamphetamine) is a lesser-known psychedelic drug. MEDA was first synthesized by Alexander Shulgin. In his book PiHKAL, the minimum dosage is listed as 200 mg, and the duration unknown. MEDA produces few to no effects.  Very little data exists about the pharmacological properties, metabolism, and toxicity of MEDA.

See also 

 Phenethylamine
 Psychedelics, dissociatives and deliriants

References 

Substituted amphetamines